Kienberg is the name of several places:

 Kienberg (Gärten der Welt) (Berlin U-Bahn), a railway station
 Kienberg, Bavaria, Germany
 Kienberg, Switzerland
 Loučovice, a village in South Bohemia, known as Kienberg in German